Naftali "Tali" Tishby (28 December 1952 – 9 August 2021) was a professor of computer science and computational neuroscientist at the Hebrew University of Jerusalem.

Early life and education
Tishby was born in 1952. His father Yeshaya Tishby is a researcher of Kabbalah and Jewish thought.

In 1971 he graduated the Hebrew University Secondary School, joined the academic Atuda in the Israel Defense Forces (IDF) and served in the IDF until 1980. That year he received the Israel Defense Prize.

In 1974 he graduated B.Sc. cum laude in Mathematics in Physics from the Hebrew University. In 1980 he graduated M.Sc. cum laude in Theoretical Physics at Tel Aviv University; his M.Sc. thesis topic was "Spallation  nuclear  reactions in the  galactic  cosmic  rays". In 1985 he completed Ph.D. studies in the Hebrew University, publishing the thesis "Reduced Dynamical Description: An Information Theoretic Approach". He did his post-doctoral studies at MIT from 1985 to 1986.

Career
From 1986 until 1991 he worked in Bell Labs in Murray Hill, New Jersey.

In 1992 he became a senior lecturer in the Computer science faculty in the Hebrew University and became an associate professor in 1997.

He was the founder of the Hebrew University's Interdisciplinary Center for Neural Computation, the Edmond and Lily Safra Center for Brain Sciences, and the Sudarsky Center for Computational Biology. In 1998 he founded and chaired the computer engineering program.

He worked on the mathematical and statistical theory of learning and biological adaptation.

Personal life and death
Tishby was married and has four children. Tishby died on 9 August 2021 at the age of 68.

References

External links 
 

1953 births
2021 deaths
People from Jerusalem
Israel Defense Prize recipients
Israeli computer scientists
Israeli neuroscientists
Hebrew University of Jerusalem alumni
Tel Aviv University alumni
Academic staff of the Hebrew University of Jerusalem
Scientists at Bell Labs
Artificial intelligence researchers